The sohaegeum is a North Korean musical instrument, developed in the 1960s. It is essentially a modernized form of the haegeum (a traditional Korean bowed vertical fiddle). So (hanja: 四) in sohaegeum means "four", because it has four strings.

Its tuning pegs are like those of the violin, inserted from the side, compared to those of the haegeum, which are inserted from the front. The bow used is not used in between the strings but is played from the front like the violin also.

See also
Haegum
Huqin
Kokyū
Traditional Korean musical instruments

References

External links
Sohaegum photo
Sohaegum photo

Korean musical instruments
Bowed instruments